Kupres, also known as Kupres Republike Srpske (Купрес Републике Српске) is a municipality in western Republika Srpska, an entity of Bosnia and Herzegovina. It is bordering the region of Bosanska Krajina to the north. It is one of the most undeveloped and poorest municipalities in Bosnia and Herzegovina. The seat of the municipality is the village of Novo Selo.

History
The municipality was formed after the formation of the two entities of  Federation of Bosnia and Herzegovina and Republika Srpska which together comprise the sovereign state of Bosnia and Herzegovina. The creation of the two entities split the original municipality of Kupres in two, one municipality in Federation of Bosnia and Herzegovina and the other in Republika Srpska. During the war the municipality name was changed to Srpski Kupres (Српски Купрес), but since then the Government of Bosnia and Herzegovina has forbidden the use of that name in order to avoid nationalistic sentiment.

As of 2019, it is one of the smallest municipalities by number of inhabitants in Republika Srpska.

Settlements
 Mrđanovci
 Novo Selo
 Šemenovci
 Rastičevo

Demographics

Population

Ethnic composition

See also
 Municipalities of Republika Srpska

References

External links

 Municipalities of Republika Srpska

Municipalities of Republika Srpska